David Gareth Lewis (13 August 1931 – 27 May 1997 was an Anglican priest in the second half of the twentieth century.

Lewis was educated at Cyfarthfa Grammar School, Bangor University, Oriel College, Oxford and St Michael's College, Llandaff. He was ordained deacon in 1960 and priest in 1961. After a curacy in Neath he was Vice-Principal of Salisbury Theological College from 1963 to 1969; Dean of Belize from 1969 to 1978; Vicar of St Mark, Newport from 1978 to 1982; a canon residentiary of Newport Cathedral from 1982 to 1990; and Dean of Monmouth from 1990 to 1996.

References

1931 births
People from Merthyr Tydfil
People educated at Cyfarthfa Grammar School
Alumni of St Michael's College, Llandaff
Alumni of Bangor University
Alumni of Oriel College, Oxford
Deans of Monmouth
Deans of Belize
1997 deaths